Wei Jingsheng (born 20 May 1950) is a Chinese human rights activist and dissident. He is best known for his involvement in the Chinese democracy movement.  He is most prominent for having authored the essay "The Fifth Modernization", which was posted on the Democracy Wall in Beijing in 1978. As punishment for writing his manifesto, Wei was arrested and convicted of "counter-revolutionary" activities, and he was detained as a political prisoner from 1979 to 1993. Briefly released in 1993, Wei continued to engage in his dissident activities by speaking to visiting journalists, and as punishment, he was imprisoned again from 1994 to 1997, making it a total of 18 years he has spent in various prisons. He was deported to the United States of America on 16 November 1997, on medical parole. Still a Chinese citizen, in 1998 Wei established the Wei Jingsheng Foundation in New York City (now based in Washington, D.C.) whose stated aim is to work to improve human rights and advocate democratization in China.

Early years
Wei was the oldest of four children, brought up by Chinese Communist Party cadres. In 1966,  Wei joined the Red Guards as a 16-year-old student during the Cultural Revolution. He lived in remote rural areas in Northern China and was able to speak with  peasant farmers about the widespread famines that had occurred a few years before, during the Great Leap Forward. He uncovered the role that the communist government under Mao Zedong played in causing the famines, and it forced Wei to start questioning the nature of the system which he lived under. Wei would later write about this period: "I felt as if I had suddenly awakened from a long dream, but everyone around me was still plunged in darkness." In 1973, he began working as an electrician at the Beijing Zoo.

Democracy Wall
Wei did not publicly voice his feelings until 1978, when he decided to take part in the newly emerging Democracy Wall movement which was then taking place in Beijing. On 5 December 1978, he posted an essay which he authored on the wall. Entitled "The Fifth Modernization," Wei's essay was a response to Paramount leader Deng Xiaoping's essay, the Four Modernizations. The basic theme of Wei's essay is that democracy should also be a modernization goal for China along with the other four modernizations which were proposed by Deng (industry, agriculture, science and technology, and national defense).

Wei signed the essay with his real name and address. The essay immediately caused a stir because of its boldness and because its author was not anonymous. It was also the only essay which addressed Deng Xiaoping by name, and it was also the only essay which referred to him as a dictator.  

Wei differed from the mainstream of the Democracy Wall movement (which believed that the primary conflict was between a bureaucratic class and the people) because unlike the majority of movement participants, he argued that a totalitarian political system was the source of the people's grievances. He was one of the few activists who explicitly argued against Marxism and the leadership of a Marxist party.

Arrest and imprisonment
Wei was also known for his editorial work in the short-lived magazine Explorations in 1979. He had also published a letter under his name in March 1979 in which he denounced the inhuman conditions which existed in Beijing's Qincheng Prison, where the 10th Panchen Lama was imprisoned.

His dissident writings eventually led him to be tried and imprisoned. Orville Schell, a writer and academic who specializes in China, wrote:

Wei ultimately spent a total of 18 years in different prisons in China. The letters which he wrote in which he explained his views while he was in prison were compiled into a book, The Courage to Stand Alone: Letters from Prison and Other Writings. Some of the letters were directly addressed to Deng Xiaoping, other letters were addressed to different family members of Wei. He remained imprisoned until 14 September 1993, when he was released just one week before the International Olympic Committee held a vote over whether it should award the 2000 Summer Olympics to Beijing or Sydney. Wei continued to speak out, despite the threat of arrest.

On 27 February 1994, Wei met with United States Assistant Secretary of State for Human Rights John Shattuck to discuss human rights conditions in China, and he also met with journalists. Wei was arrested the following week along with fifteen other democracy and labor activists. Although he was released shortly afterward and sent into exile in Tianjin, Wei was arrested once more on 1 April 1994 when he tried to return to Beijing. Charged with plotting against the state, he was sentenced to 14 years in prison, but he would only remain in prison until 16 November 1997, when he was released, ostensibly for medical reasons, and promptly deported to the United States. He was sent to the United States due to international pressure, especially the request by the then US President Bill Clinton.

COVID-19 
In a September 2021 documentary titled What Really Happened in Wuhan by Australian journalist and author Sharri Markson, Wei claimed that he attempted to warn American authorities about COVID-19 in October 2019 after being informed of an outbreak by contacts in Beijing.  He also claims that China was aware of the virus much sooner than they admitted and intentionally spread the virus during the World Military Games in Wuhan when they were held between 19 and 27 October 2019.

Recognition
In 1996, Wei Jingsheng was awarded the Sakharov Prize for Freedom of Thought. He is a winner of numerous other human rights and democracy awards, including the Robert F. Kennedy Human Rights Award in 1996, the National Endowment for Democracy Award in 1997, the Olof Palme Memorial Prize in 1994, and the International Activist Award by the Gleitsman Foundation in 1993.

See also
 List of Chinese dissidents
 Wang Dan (dissident)

References

External links 

 Wei Jingsheng Foundation (魏京生基金会网页 )
 Wei Jingsheng; Letters to Deng Xiaoping
 Wei Jingsheng  Freedom Collection interview

1950 births
Chinese dissidents
Chinese democracy activists
Writers from Beijing
Olof Palme Prize laureates
Chinese human rights activists
Living people
Prisoners and detainees of the People's Republic of China
Prisoners and detainees of China
High School Affiliated to Renmin University of China alumni
Red Guards
Sakharov Prize laureates
Robert F. Kennedy Human Rights Award laureates
Chinese political prisoners